Teodora Gjorgjevska (Macedonian: Теодора Ѓорѓевска, Teodora Đorđevska; born 19 March 2000) is a Macedonian footballer who plays as a defender for Dragon and the North Macedonia national team.

International career
Gjorgjevska made her debut for the North Macedonia national team on 25 November 2021, against Northern Ireland.

References

2000 births
Living people
Women's association football defenders
Macedonian women's footballers
North Macedonia women's international footballers
ŽFK Dragon 2014 players